Miss World USA 1973 was the 12th edition of the Miss World USA pageant. It was held in Binghamton, New York and was won by Marjorie Wallace of Indiana. She was crowned by outgoing titleholder, Lynda Jean Córdoba Carter of Arizona. Wallace went on to represent the United States at the Miss World 1973 Pageant in London later that year, where she ended up winning Miss World. Due to protocol, the 1st runner-up, Lexie Brockway, replaced Wallace as Miss World USA after Wallace won Miss World 1973.

Results

Placements

∞ Wallace won Miss World 1973. Due to protocol, Wallace resigns her title as Miss World USA 1973. 1st runner-up, Lexie Brockway, replaces her as Miss World USA.

Special awards

Delegates
The Miss World USA 1973 delegates were:

 Alabama - Jacqueline Parker
 Alaska - Rhonda Rae Dodds
 Arizona - Carol J. Dawson
 Arkansas - Janet Roberts
 California - Toni Tuso
 Colorado - Sherri Bilanzich
 Connecticut - Beverly M. Lyga
 Delaware - Denise Spillan
 District of Columbia - Sandra E. German
 Florida -  Denise Ann Kranich
 Georgia - Henrietta K. Hall
 Hawaii - Gail Rouleau
 Idaho - Wendy Hatch
 Illinois - Lea Ann Minalga
 Indiana - Marjorie Wallace
 Iowa - Unknown
 Kansas - Stephanie Warren
 Kentucky - Charlesy Ann Gulick
 Louisiana - Deborah Denise Rayburn
 Maryland - Bonnie Joy Bidlack
 Massachusetts - Jeanine Tessier
 Michigan - Corrine L. Bozin
 Minnesota - Annette Walensky
 Mississippi - Barbara Moree
 Missouri - Nikki Edward
 Montana - Robin Wright
 Nebraska - Linda Jean Liebsch
 Nevada - Trenna V. Gulbransen
 New Hampshire - Lori Ann Rotwitt
 New Jersey - Jean Gallena
 New Mexico - Donna Reel
 New York - Vanessa J. Santo
 North Carolina - Doris E. Davis
 North Dakota - Nancy Van Der Veer 
 Ohio - Joan Marie Rankin
 Oklahoma - Rebecca O'Haver
 Oregon - Brenda Joyce Knapper
 Pennsylvania - Betsy Royal
 Rhode Island - Ann Marie Bianco
 South Carolina - Claudie Ruth Bell
 South Dakota - Yasma Haramiya
 Tennessee - Sandra Jean Lawson
 Texas - Sherry Lynn Norwell
 Utah - Stella Marie Bolton
 Vermont - Arlene Bruce
 Virginia - Lauren Ann Riley
 Washington - Lexie H. Brockway
 West Virginia - Jo Ann Zovko
 Wisconsin - Sue Bishop
 Wyoming - Joy "Joyce" Bernann McKinney

Notes

Did not Compete
 - Iola M. Bragdon

Crossovers
Contestants who competed in other beauty pageants:

Miss USA
1972: : Donna Reel (Top 12)
1974: : Charlesy Ann Gulick (Best State Costume)

Miss America
1975: : Donna Reel (Top 10)

Miss World America
1972: : Rhonda Rae Dodds
1972: : Trenna V. Gulbransen

References

External links
Miss World Official Website
Miss World America Official Website

1973 in the United States
World America
1973
1973 in New York (state)